Tattoo is a 2014 Italian dramatic short film directed by Riccardo Di Gerlando.

Synopsis
An old man is passionate about tattoo art for a personal revenge.

Accolades
Tattoo has been screened in over 40 film festivals worldwide. It won the following awards and was selected by the following festivals:
Award of Excellence Special Mention Accolade Global Film Competition – Web Award (USA) 
Award of Excellence Best Shorts Competition – Web Award (USA)
Platinum Awards Filmmakers of the Year Film Festival – Jakarta (Indonesia)
Platinum Awards International Movie Awards – Jakarta (Indonesia)
Platinum Award Best story Documentary & Short International Movie Award – Jakarta (Indonesia)
Diamond Award Film and Photography Festival (IFPF) - Depok (Indonesia)
Narrative Best Short International Film Festival for Spirituality, Religion, and Visionary – Jakarta (Indonesia)
Award of Excellence International Film Festival for Documentary, Short, and Comedy – Jakarta (Indonesia)
Four Outstanding Mentions Zed Fest Film festival – Burbank (California, USA)
Official Nomination Great Lakes International Film Festival – Erie (Pennsylvania, USA)
Official Nomination “Best Dark Drama Short Film” Terror Film Festival – (Pennsylvania, USA)
Official Selection Golden Palmera Film Festival – (Dubai)
Official Selection Audience Awards Dramatic Shorts Competition – Missoula (Montana, USA)
Official Selection iChill Manila Film Fest – Manila (Filippine)
Official Selection Fincortex Festival International de Cortometrajes – Tunja (Colombia)
Official Selection Access Code Short Film Festival- Bangalora (India)
Official Selection Vibgyor International Film Festival -  Thrissur (Kerala, India)
Official Selection IMA International Film Festival – Thrissur (Kerala, India)
Official Selection Filmmakers of the Year Festival – Jakarta (Indonesia)
Official Selection Macabre Faire Film Festival – Long Island (New York, USA)
Official Selection Big Mini Media international Film Festival – Brooklyn (USA)
Official Selection Sandpoint International Film Festival – (USA)
Official Selection Creative Arts Film Festival – Online Festival (USA)
Official Selection Tattoo Arts Film Festival – (Canada)
Official Selection Nile’s Diaspora International Film Festival NDIFF –  Jinja (Uganda)
Official Selection Festival International de Cortometrajes Fenaco – Cuzco (Perù)
Official Selection Jumpthecut International Film Festival – (Singapore)
Official Selection Festival de Cine de Terror y Fantastico  - Peligros (Spagna)

References

External links

Films about tattooing